Aysén Province is one of four provinces of the Chilean region of Aysen (XI). Its capital is Puerto Aysén.

Demographics
The province had a 2002 population of 23,498 according to the census by the National Statistics Institute. Of these, 16,180 (68.9%) lived in urban areas and 13,451 (57.2%) in rural areas. Between the 1992 and 2002 censuses, the population fell by 20.7% ( persons).

Administration
As a province, Palena is a second-level administrative division, administered by a presidentially appointed governor. Manuel Ortiz Torres was appointed by president Sebastián Piñera.

Communes
The province comprises three communes, each governed by a municipality, headed by an alcalde: Aisén, Cisnes, and Guaitecas.

Origin of name

During the 1990s, it was suggested that the name might be derived from an 1831 map made by captain Robert Fitz-Roy, who made an expedition to the coast on board the Beagle with Charles Darwin and labeled the area around modern Aisén province with the words "Ice End." This theory, however, was largely dismissed because the name "Aysen" appears in documents of the explorer Father Garcia, who made an expedition to this region in 1766, more than 60 years prior to the arrival of the Beagle. Despite this, the Fitz-Roy myth has become popular among the many European tourists who visit Patagonia each year. See Aisén (name) for more information. Many of the region's people are of British and German descent (including Sudeten Germans from present Czech Republic), although the majority of inhabitants are Chileans of mestizo Spanish origins. The province was recently developed in the early 20th century by Chilean government officials to place thousands of transplanted settlers from the Central Valley.

References

External links
  Government of Aisén

Provinces of Aysén Region
Provinces of Chile